Michel Stolker (29 September 1933 – 28 May 2018) was a Dutch former professional racing cyclist. He rode in three editions of the Tour de France. Stolker died on 28 May 2018 at the age of 84.

References

External links
 

1933 births
2018 deaths
Dutch male cyclists
Sportspeople from Utrecht (city)
Cyclists from Utrecht (province)